The Santa Clara Broncos men's soccer program represents Santa Clara University in all NCAA Division I men's college soccer competitions. Founded in 1967, the Broncos compete in the West Coast Conference. The Broncos are coached by Cameron Rast, who has coached the program since 2002.

The men's soccer program has won one NCAA title, which they co-shared with Virginia, in 1989. Most the programs success came in the 1990s, where they reached the national championship game twice, and reached the College Cup on three occasions.

Postseason

NCAA tournament results 
Santa Clara has appeared in 21 NCAA Tournaments. Their tournament record is 24–17–6

References 
Main
 
 
Footnotes

External links 
 

 
1967 establishments in California
Association football clubs established in 1967